Fairfield Manor, also known as the Fairfield Manor Apartments, is a historic apartment building located one mile south of downtown Fort Wayne, Indiana. It was designed by noted Fort Wayne architect Charles R. Weatherhogg. It is a seven-story plus basement, rectangular, Colonial Revival style brick building with a slight "bar-bell" form. It has American Craftsman and interior Art Deco design elements.  The building measures 68 feet by 190 feet.

It was listed on the National Register of Historic Places in 1983.

References

Residential buildings on the National Register of Historic Places in Indiana
Residential buildings completed in 1928
Colonial Revival architecture in Indiana
Buildings and structures in Fort Wayne, Indiana
National Register of Historic Places in Fort Wayne, Indiana